Colfax at Auraria station is an light rail station in Denver, Colorado, United States. It is served by the D and H Lines, operated by the Regional Transportation District (RTD), and was opened on October 8, 1994. It serves the eastern side of the Auraria academic campus, home to Metropolitan State College of Denver, the Community College of Denver, and the University of Colorado Denver.

In 2008, the station was remodeled to enable the platforms to accommodate four-car trains.

References 

RTD light rail stations in Denver
Auraria Campus
Railway stations in the United States opened in 1994